The Botswana Congress Party (BCP) is a political party in Botswana. The BCP was founded in 1998 in a split from the Botswana National Front, with most of the BNF's sitting Members of Parliament joining the new party after a leadership dispute with Kenneth Koma. MPs who helped found the party included Michael Dingake, Gilson Saleshando, Paul Rantao, Maitshwarelo Dabutha, Isaac Mabiletsa and Vain Mamela. The BCP's first national conference was held in April 1999, before the general election in October 1999.

From 1998 to 2001 the BCP was led by Michael Dingake. In 2001 Otlaadisa Koosaletse became its leader. In 2005 Gilson Saleshando defeated Koosaletse to lead the party. It is affiliated with the New Democratic Front and the Social Democratic Party.

History
The BCP was formed by 11 sitting MPs and immediately became the official opposition in parliament. Party president Michael Dingake served as Leader of the Opposition until parliament was dissolved in advance of the 1999 general elections. In the 1999 general elections, the BCP won 11.9% of the vote and retained only one seat (out of 40). In the elections, 30 October 2004, the party won 16.6% of the popular vote and 1 out of 57 seats. The sole BCP member of parliament was Dumelang Saleshando, the son of then BCP president, Gilson Saleshando.

In 2009, the party contested the 2009 election in a pact with the Botswana Alliance Movement. However, talks to form an alliance with the Botswana National Front proved fruitless.

The 2009 elections proved a decisive success for the party. The BCP won 19.2% of the popular vote and 4 parliamentary seats. Its 19.2% popular vote makes it the third largest political movement in Botswana. The BCP retained the Gaborone Central constituency and won the Chobe, Okavango, and Selebi Phikwe West constituencies from the BDP. Pact partner BAM won 2.3% of the vote and defeated the former Minister of Education and Skills Development, Jacob Nkate, in the Ngami constituency. Despite its losses to the BCP, the BDP won enough constituencies from the BNF to increase its overall representation by one seat.

In May 2010, the BCP and the BAM merged under the BCP label with a new party symbol that incorporates elements of the parent parties. Following the merger, the BCP controlled 5 seats in the National Assembly.
 
On 4 September 2010, the BCP contested by elections in Tonota North constituency with the support of the other three opposition parties, Botswana National Front (BNF), Botswana Peoples Party (BPP) and the BDP breakaway party Botswana Movement for Democracy (BMD). The BCP candidate increased her vote share slightly, to 36.1%, but lost to the ruling Botswana Democratic Party (BDP).The party recently lost a key member, Member of parliament for Okavango Hon Bagalatia Aaron, who defected to the ruling Botswana Democratic Party.

Notable members 
 Michael Dingake 
 Gilson Saleshando 
 Dumelang Saleshando 
 Taolo Lucas 
 Ephraim Setshwaelo 
 Bagalatia Aarone 
 Dr Kesitegile Gobotswang 
 Motsei Madisa-Rapelana 
 Dick Bayford
 Dithapelo Keorapetse

References

External links 
 Botswana Congress Party website

Political parties in Botswana
Political parties established in 1998
1998 establishments in Botswana
Social democratic parties in Africa
Socialism in Botswana